Bartek is a Polish given name and surname, a diminutive of Bartłomiej. Notable people with this name include:

People known by the diminutive Bartek 
 Bartłomiej Bartek Niziol (born 1974), Polish violinist
 Bartłomiej Bartek Pacuszka (born 1990), Polish footballer
 Bartłomiej Bartek Kasprzykowski, Polish actor

Fictional characters with the name  
 Bartek Wilkosz, fictional character in the 2007 Polish drama film Twists of Fate

People with the surname 
 Bill Bartek, participant on The Amazing Race TV show
 David Bartek (born 1988), Czech footballer
 Martin Bartek (born 1980), Slovak ice hockey player
 Mary Bartek, author of Funerals and Fly Fishing
 Steve Bartek (born 1952), American musician and member of the band Oingo Boingo
 Jakub Bartek (born 1992), Slovak football defender
 Tomáš Bartek (born 1958), Czech former handball player

See also 
 
 

 Barak
 Bartok (disambiguation)

References 

Polish masculine given names
Czech-language surnames
Slovak-language surnames